Khalid Iqbal Yasir born on 13 March 1952, is an author, scholar, poet, and journalist. He has written several books on history, general knowledge, critics and poetry. Currently working as advisor (Pakistan Studies) at Punjab Public Service Commission, consultant at UNDP and visiting professor at AIOU, Islamabad.

Early life 
Khalid Iqbal Yasir was born in the historical town of Bhera in the Sargodha District, Pakistan. Dulla Bhatti, a legendary character of Punjabi epics and folklore was his forefather. He has been described and compared with Robin Hood of 16th-century Mughal Punjab by the British historians. After his schooling at Sargodha, Yasir earned his master's degrees in History and Pakistan Studies from University of the Punjab, Lahore and Quaid-e-Azam University respectively. Later on, he did his M. Phil in Urdu and Iqbal Studies from Allama Iqbal Open University, Islamabad and PhD in Urdu and Iqbaliyat from Islamia University, Bahawalpur.

Literary career  
Yasir brought out a handwritten literary journal "Sange-Meel" (Mile Stone) in his early days as an upcoming writer. Afterwards, he edited two magazines "Ehtasab" (Accountability) and "Irtikaz" (Focus) as student editor for his educational institutions. After doing a number of odd jobs, he joined Pakistan Academy of Letters, Islamabad in 1981 as Deputy Director/Editor. He conceived and edited quarterly "Adabiyat" (Letters) for thirteen years. He also started first-ever literary newsletter "Academy" in Urdu and edited it for more than six years for the Academy. He used to compile and edit another educational magazine entitled "Urdu Science Magazine" during his eight years stay at Urdu Science Board as its Director General from 2001 to 2009. Over there, he developed and published more than 350 books in Urdu language in various disciplines of social sciences, basic sciences, technologies and trades besides booklets for literates and neo-literates. In between 2009 and 2012 he had many stints as the Director General of Pakistan Academy of Letters, National Educational Equipment Center, National Museum of Science and Technology, Lahore. He finally superannuated as the Director General, Urdu Science Board, Lahore in March 2012.

Bibliography

Poetry 
 Darobast : (1990)
 Gardish :(2000)
 Rukhsati :(2005)
 Mizaj:(2012)

Research and Criticism  
 Ahwal-o-Aasaar:(1993)
 Iqbal and Contemporary Literary Movements:(1994) 
 103 Years of Nobel Prize-Chemistry:(2004)
 103 Years of Nobel Prize-Literature:(2004)
 103 Years of Nobel Prize-Medicine:(2004)
 103 Years of Nobel Prize-Peace:(2004) 
 103 Years of Nobel Prize-Physics:(2004)
 103 Years of Nobel Prize-Economics:(2006) 
 Modern Literary Movements and Iqbal:(2014)

Translation 
 Andaz (Patterns)/Federico Mayor:(1995)
 Muhabbat Roshan Rehti Hay/Abai Kunan Baeav:(1995)
 Delphi Ka Rathban (Charioteer in Delphi)/Peter Curman:(2000)
 Poland kee Ishqia Shairee (Treasury of Polish Love):(2001)
 Kemiadan (The Al-Chemist)/Paulo Coelho:(2001)

Other books 
 History Canada: Past and Present:(2006)
 Reference Illustrated Urdu Science Encyclopedia (10 Volumes):(2007)
 Kashhaf-Mukhaffat (Deciperment of Abbreviations):(2008)

Awards 
 Tamgha-i-Imtiaz (2010) 
 National Book Council Manuscript Award (1993)
 National Book Council Manuscript Award (1990)

References

1952 births
Pakistani poets
Urdu-language poets from Pakistan
Linguists from Pakistan
Linguists of Urdu
Urdu critics
Pakistani male journalists
Pakistani literary critics
Punjabi people
Pakistani lyricists
Living people
University of the Punjab alumni
Islamia University of Bahawalpur alumni
Quaid-i-Azam University alumni
Urdu-language translators
21st-century Urdu-language writers
Urdu-language journalists
Literary critics of Urdu